Juan Ernesto Chamorro Chitán (born 18 November 1991 in Pupiales) is a Colombian cyclist.

Palmares
2012
2nd Overall Tour de l'Avenir
10th Overall Tour de l'Ain
2013
1st Overall Ronde de l'Isard

References

1991 births
Living people
Colombian male cyclists
21st-century Colombian people